Attacus atlas, the Atlas moth, is a large saturniid moth endemic to the forests of Asia. The species was first described by Carl Linnaeus in his 1758 10th edition of Systema Naturae.

Description

It is only surpassed in wingspan by the white witch (Thysania agrippina) and Attacus caesar, and in wing surface area by the Hercules moth (Coscinocera hercules). As in most silk moths, females are noticeably larger and heavier than males, while males have broader antennae.

The body is disproportionately small compared to the wings. The upperside of the wings are reddish brown with a pattern of black, white, pink, and purple lines and triangular, scale-less windows bordered in black. The undersides of the wings are paler. Both forewings have a prominent extension at the tip, with markings that resemble the head of a snake, a resemblance which is exaggerated by movements of the wings when the moth is confronted by potential predators.

The Atlas moth has a very short, vestigial proboscis, and they do not eat once they have emerged from the cocoon, relying on fat storage for energy. Every flight takes valuable energy and can take days off their already short lives, as it has a very short life span of only one to two weeks. They conserve energy by flying as little as possible. A female will wait for a male to come along and be fertilised, lay eggs and die.

Habitat

Their habitat is primarily dry tropical forests, secondary forests, and shrublands across South Asia, East Asia, and Southeast Asia, including Borneo.

This species has been found outside of its native range on at least two occasions. An adult female was found in 2012 in Ramsbottom, England after it landed on a windowsill, and is presumed to have escaped from a private collection. Another specimen was photographed in Bellevue, Washington in July 2022, the first time this species has been detected in the United States.

Etymology
Atlas moths are named after Atlas, the Titan of Greek mythology (due to their size). In Hong Kong, the Cantonese means "snake's head moth", referring to the prominent extension of the forewing which bears resemblance to the head of a snake.

Life cycle

Mating
Females release powerful pheromones through a gland on the end of the abdomen to attract a mate. The female does not stray far from the location of her discarded cocoon. She seeks out a perch where the air currents will best carry her pheromones. Males can detect and home in on these pheromones from several kilometers away using chemoreceptors located on their feathery antennae. Once fertilized, the female lays a number of spherical eggs,  in diameter, on the undersides of the leaves of food plants.

Larva
Dusty-green caterpillars hatch after approximately two weeks and feed voraciously on the foliage of citrus, cinnamon, guava, and evergreen trees. They are adorned with white, waxy, fleshy spines along their backs, which become more prominent at later instars. Beside the prolegs on the last abdominal segment, there is a large green spot surrounded by an orange ring. The majority of the time their first meal is their egg-shell.

Pupa
They spin a 7–8 cm long papery cocoon interwoven with desiccated leaves and attach it to a twig using a strand of silk. The adult moths emerge from the cocoon after approximately four weeks depending on environmental factors.

Imago

Adult Atlas moths are weak, unsteady fliers. To conserve energy, the moths rest during the day and fly at night. As they lack fully formed mouthparts, the adults cannot eat, subsisting entirely on fat reserves accumulated during the larval stage. As a result, they live for only a few days during which their sole objective is seeking out a mate. Adults may be found on wing throughout the year but are most abundant between November and January.

Relationship with humans

In India, Atlas moths are cultivated for their silk in a non-commercial capacity. Unlike silk produced by the related domestic silkmoth (Bombyx mori), Atlas moth silk is secreted as broken strands and is therefore less desirable. This brown, wool-like silk, known as fagara, is thought to have greater durability. Atlas moth cocoons are sometimes used as small pocket change purses in Taiwan. There is ongoing research as to whether the silk of the Atlas moth can be used as a substitute for common silks. The quality of the heavier cocoons, less restrictive rearing conditions and competent properties of the fibers, makes the silk produced by the Atlas moth a potential alternative for common silks. A study concluded that the silk fibers of the atlas moth had about an 80% higher density of cells and growth compared to the silk fibers of the silk moth.

The Japanese subspecies A. a. ryukyuensis, native to Yonaguni in the Yaeyama Islands, may have served as inspiration for the movie monster Mothra.

Similar taxa
The term "Atlas moth" is sometimes used mistakenly as a name for any species in the genus Attacus, of which there are over 20 named species and subspecies. Attacus taprobanis native to southern India and Sri Lanka is very similar in morphology to the much more widely distributed Attacus atlas. It was once considered a subspecies of A. atlas. A few New World species can be mistaken for Atlas moths, specifically members of the genus Rothschildia. Very similar in appearance to the Asian Atlas moth, Rothschildia aurota is one of the largest members of its genus and a Neotropical relative.

See also 
 List of largest insects

References

External links

Moths of Asia
Silk
Moths described in 1758
Taxa named by Carl Linnaeus
Saturniidae
Invertebrates of Malaysia
Fauna of Yunnan